Ramon Chibb is an Indian filmmaker, the Co-founder and Director of Manomay Motion Pictures Pvt. Ltd.

Biography
Chibb's father served in the Indian Air Force, as a result Ramon grew up on various air force stations across the country including Jorhat, Wellington, Agra, Baroda, Delhi, Secunderabad and Ahmedabad. He studied Economics at St. Xavier's College (Ahmedabad). He joined the Indian Army in 1990 and served in the Kumaon Regiment till 1995.

Chibb joined the fast growing media industry in 1995 and was soon directing and producing documentaries, TV shows and ad films.  In 2003, he executive-produced the first big local production of National Geographic Channel in India, Mission Everest. He further directed big-ticket reality shows and documentaries for Zee, Star, NGC and UTV.

He went on to become Senior Vice President heading content for National Geographic and Fox International channels in India.

Chibb was Vice President – Head of Content of Zee’s digital arm DMCL.

He later became Vice President – Head of Content and Operations for UTV Bindass, a youth entertainment TV brand, during the launch phase.
As Head of Content he has launched Fox Traveller, Bindass and Bindass Movies.

Chibb is best known for creating armed forces content for television. He has produced and directed the first four ‘’Mission Mini’’ series on National Geographic India. Besides ‘’Mission Everest’’ he has produced and directed ‘’Mission Udaan – Inside the Indian Air Force, Mission Navy’’ and ‘’Mission Army’’.

Since 2013 Chibb has been developing and producing films along with his wife Anku Pande in their company Manomay Motion Pictures Pvt Ltd.

Television credits

References

External links
 

Living people
Year of birth missing (living people)
Indian filmmakers